The Dutch Tweede Divisie in the 1960–61 season was contested by 18 teams, that would for the first time play in one league instead of two.

Two teams would be directly promoted to the Eerste Divisie. The 3rd- and 4th-place finishers would play against one another and the winner would take on a team from the Eerste Divisie itself.

New entrants
Relegated from the Eerste Divisie
 Rigtersbleek
 De Graafschap

League standings

Promotion/relegation

Relegation play-off

Promotion/relegation play-off

RKVV Wilhelmina were promoted to the Eerste Divisie.

See also
 1960–61 Eredivisie
 1960–61 Eerste Divisie

References
Netherlands - List of final tables (RSSSF)

Tweede Divisie seasons
3
Neth